Narcissus common latent virus (NCLV) is a plant pathogenic virus. It infects Narcissus plants. The term 'latent' refers to the fact that infection may be symptomless. Transmission occurs by Aphids.

Taxonomy 
This Carlavirus should not be confused with the similarly named Narcissus latent virus which is a Macluravirus, and is sometimes incorrectly referred to by the latter name.

References

Bibliography

External links
 Uniprot NcLaVgp1
 Narcissus common latent virus, USDA
 Narcissus common latent virus, EPPO Global Database

Carlaviruses
Viral plant pathogens and diseases